Barry Glendenning (born 12 March 1973) is an Irish sports journalist who holds the position of deputy sports editor on the guardian.co.uk website run by UK newspaper The Guardian.

Glendenning was born in Birr, County Offaly and attended Cistercian College, Roscrea; then he studied for a B.A. degree at University College Dublin (UCD), which however, he did not complete due to poor academic ability.

Career
Glendenning is currently deputy sports editor at guardian.co.uk and best known for his work on The Guardian'''s football podcast Football Weekly, of which Glendenning has claimed he is ‘the beating heart’. He also regularly contributes to the site's satirical daily email service, The Fiver. He is often responsible for the Guardian Unlimited "minute-by-minute reports", which feature live text coverage of Premier League, Champions League and international matches and other sports.

Glendenning can also be heard co-hosting the Warm-Up with Max Rushden on Talksport on Sunday mornings from 11am to 1pm. A particular feature of the show is the game "Culverhouse" which is a football based version of the game "Mornington Crescent" from 1970s radio show I'm Sorry I Haven't a Clue. He once recorded a TV pilot with Rushden and Paul Merson. The pilot proved unsuccessful when Rushden and Glendenning asked Merson whether he would rather have spoons for hands or forks for feet.

Glendenning has been described as having "the sexiest voice on radio" by singer Liz McClarnon.

ControversiesThe Guardian'' printed an apology in response to complaints regarding comments made by Barry in a segment about Sir Jack Hayward on a football podcast, when Hayward was described as having been "quite openly xenophobic and racist".  Glendenning also later apologised for his choice of words.

Personal life
His father, Sam, a vet, died on 23 December 2021.

Glendenning is co-owner of Lewes F.C.

See also
Max Rushden
Jonathan Wilson
Barney Ronay

References

External links
 Guardian Unlimited Football
 Guardian Football Weekly (featuring Barry Glendenning)
 Archive of articles for The Hot Press  (You have to be a subscriber to access the articles)
 Interview with Barry Glendenning
 Interview with Barry Glendenning for the Football Blog European Football Weekends
Interview by Jarlath Regan - An Irishman Abroad series

1973 births
Living people
Irish podcasters
Irish sports journalists
Male journalists
People educated at Cistercian College, Roscrea
People from Birr, County Offaly
The Guardian journalists